Martin Blake may refer to:

Martin Blake (clergyman) (1593–1673), English bishop
Martin J. Blake (1853–1930), Irish historian
Martin Joseph Blake (1790–1861), Irish politician